Milan Kučera (born 1963) is a Czechoslovak-Slovak slalom canoeist who competed at the international level from 1982 to 1993.

He won seven medals at the ICF Canoe Slalom World Championships with two golds (C2 team: 1983, 1985 both for Czechoslovakia), three silvers (C2 team: 1987, 1989, 1991 all for Czechoslovakia) and two bronzes (C2: 1987 for Czechoslovakia; C2 team: 1993 for Slovakia).

His partner in the C2 boat from 1982 to 1989 was Miroslav Hajdučík. From 1991 to 1993 he paddled with Viktor Beneš.

World Cup individual podiums

References

Czechoslovak male canoeists
Slovak male canoeists
Living people
1963 births
Medalists at the ICF Canoe Slalom World Championships